Philip Dehany  (died 1809)  was a West Indies plantation owner and  cricket  pioneer. He sat in the House of Commons from 1778 to 1780.

Early life
Dehany was the eldest son  of David Dehany, merchant of Bristol and planter of Jamaica, and his wife Mary Gregory, daughter of Matthew Gregory. He was educated at Westminster School and was admitted at Trinity College, Cambridge on 3 July 1752 aged 18. In 1754 he succeeded his father to the Point and Barbican sugar estates in Hanover, Jamaica.

Cricket

Dehany was at school and university with the Rev Charles Powlett, son of Charles Powlett, 3rd Duke of Bolton.  In  1763 Powlett became curate of a parish near Hambledon where Delany helped him establish the Hambledon Club based on the local cricket team. The club was as much about drinking and gambling as cricket. Dehany was a member of the  Committee which revised the Laws of Cricket at the Star and Garter Hotel in Pall Mall in 1774.

Political career
Dehany purchased Kempshott manor in about 1773. He demolished  the old manor-house, and replaced it by a large brick mansion. Dehany maintained his links with the Powlett family down to  Harry Powlett, 6th Duke of Bolton who had supported his  West Indies  friend Edward Morant  in Parliament.  Dehany was returned as Member of Parliament for St Ives on Bolton's interest at a by-election on 26 December 1778. However he did not stand at the 1780 general election two years later.

Later years and legacy
Dehany married Margaret Salter Hooper and had a daughter - Mary Salter Dehany. Their group portrait was painted by Thomas Gainsborough. In 1787 he sold Kempshott. and in 1797 purchased  Hayes Place, Kent. He died on 27 October 1809 and was buried at Hayes on 6 November 1809.

References

1809 deaths
Businesspeople from Bristol
People educated at Westminster School, London
Alumni of Trinity College, Cambridge
Hambledon cricketers
Cricket patrons
British MPs 1774–1780
Members of the Parliament of Great Britain for St Ives
Politicians from Bristol
Cricketers from Bristol